The Dart Harbour & Navigation Authority (DHNA) is a trust port responsible under United Kingdom law for the stewardship of Dartmouth Harbour. The Authority was formed in 1976 from the merger of the River Dart Navigation Commission and the Dart Harbour Commission which had been established in the 1880s. It was constituted under the Dart Harbour and Navigation Authority Act 1975, and The Dart Harbour and Navigation Harbour Revision (Constitution) Order 2002.

Dart Harbour's navigation marks are inspected annually by Trinity House.

Dart Harbour maintains some 270 pontoons and 1,600 moorings within the harbour limits.

See also

 Britannia Royal Naval College
 Dart Lifeboat Station
 Dartmouth Higher Ferry
 Dartmouth Lower Ferry
 Dartmouth Passenger Ferry
 NCI Froward Point

External links
Official website

References

Dartmouth, Devon
Ports and harbours of England by city
1976 establishments in England
River Dart
Competent harbour authorities